Eating Jello with a Heated Fork is 1996 studio album recorded by Mick Farren and friends released under the name Deviants IXVI.

The album was recorded with longtime friends and collaborators Andy Colquhoun and Jack Lancaster and featured Wayne Kramer and his band.

Track listing
"Eating Jello with a Heated Fork" (Farren, Colquhoun)
"On Such a Lurid Night" (Farren, Colquhoun)
"God's Worst Nightmare" (Farren, Kramer)
"Thunder on the Mountain" (Farren, Colquhoun)
"Three Headed Lobster Boy" (Farren, Lancaster)
"You Won't Make It Here" (Farren, Lancaster)
"Arts of Darkness" (Farren, Lancaster)
"Hard Times" (Farren, Colquhoun)
"Rivers of Hell" (Farren, Colquhoun)

Personnel
Mick Farren – vocals
Andy Colquhoun – guitar
Jack Lancaster – saxophone
Wayne Kramer – guitar
Paul Ill – bass
Brock Avery – drums, percussion
Brad Dourif - didgeridoo on "Three Headed Lobster Boy"
Chuck Briggs, Kerry Martinez, Duane Peters, Susan Slater, Ernie Snair, Gary Twinn - backing vocals

References

The Deviants (band) albums
1996 albums
Alive Naturalsound Records albums